Danièle Kaber (born 20 April 1960) is a retired female long-distance runner from Luxembourg. She set her personal best (2:29:23) in the marathon at the 1988 Summer Olympics. Kaber is a three-time Luxembourgian Sportswoman of the Year (1985, 1986 and 1988).

International competitions

References

External links

1960 births
Living people
Luxembourgian female long-distance runners
Luxembourgian female marathon runners
Olympic athletes of Luxembourg
Athletes (track and field) at the 1988 Summer Olympics
World Athletics Championships athletes for Luxembourg